The  was held in 2015 in Yokohama, Kanagawa, Japan.

Awards
 Best Film: - The Light Shines Only There
 Best Director:
 Mipo O - The Light Shines Only There
 Momoko Andō - 0.5mm
 Yoshimitsu Morita Memorial Best New Director: Nao Kubota - Homeland
 Best Screenplay: Ryō Takada - The Light Shines Only There and Silver Spoon
 Best Cinematographer: Ryūto Kondō - The Light Shines Only There and My Man
 Best Actor: Gō Ayano - The Light Shines Only There
 Best Actress: Rie Miyazawa - Pale Moon
 Best Supporting Actor: Sosuke Ikematsu - Pale Moon and Bokutachi no Kazoku
 Best Supporting Actress:
 Satomi Kobayashi - Pale Moon
 Yuko Oshima - Pale Moon
 Best Newcomer:
 Mugi Kadowaki - Love's Whirlpool, Yamikin Ushijima-kun Part2, Shanti Days 365-nichi, Shiawasena Kokyū
 Nana Seino - Tokyo Tribes and Shōjo wa Isekai de Tatakatta
 Ema Sakura - Bon to Lin chan
 Mahiro Takasugi - Bon to Lin chan
 Special Grand Prize: Masahiko Tsugawa

Best 10
 The Light Shines Only There
 Pale Moon
 0.5mm
 Wood Job!
 My Man
 Bokutachi no Kazoku
 Love's Whirlpool
 Homeland
 Nononanananoka
 Hotori no Sakuko
runner-up. Lady Maiko

References

Yokohama Film Festival
Yokohama Film Festival
2015 in Japanese cinema
2015 festivals in Asia